Jaguar! is a junior roller coaster located at Knott's Berry Farm in Buena Park, California. Built by Zierer and designed by Werner Stengel, the coaster opened to the public in 1995.

History
In December 1994, Knott's Berry Farm announced that Jaguar! would be coming to the park. The ride would cost $10 million to build. Although it was set to open in May 1995, this was delayed. Jaguar! would open on June 17, 1995.

Ride experience

Queue
Riders approach the ride through the temple in the Fiesta Village section of the park. Many Mayan-style drawings and paintings can be seen on the walls throughout the entire temple. The bottom queue is the most themed part. On one side, riders can see prisoners that were imprisoned in the temple that are now just skeletons. On another side, riders see a giant Aztec idol with skulls on the side of him. The bottom walls are painted to show Aztec gatherings with prisoners and others. The queue winds through a series of rooms and tunnels. As riders walk up the next ramp, they can see more skulls into the temple. Straight ahead, there is giant stone tablet of some more Mayan Jaguar Warriors with the head of a jaguar. To the left of that, there is another Mayan idol head. Riders can sometimes hear the roaring of the Jaguar, activated when the train enters the helix located at the end of the coaster. Tribal drums and other Mayan sound effects can also be heard. The queue rises in elevation to the station where riders board the roller coaster.

Layout
The ride starts out with ascending a lift hill after exiting the station. Next, the coaster goes to the left and  down slightly. After that, the coaster does a banked right turn up, and then travels through the top of the temple (where the fire effect used to occur) and then goes through the loop of  MonteZOOMa: The Forbidden Fortress. The train then turns right and travels up a second lift hill. The track bends left, and the coaster goes through a series of bunny hills. As the track approaches the Timber Mountain Log Ride, it turns around. The train travels through some more bunny hills, then does a banked helix to the left. Finally, it goes into a brake run and arrives back in the station.

Lifts
The train is propelled by drive tires because of the short distance of the two lifts. These tires vary in tread pattern. The main tread pattern is recycled rubber diamond cut. Some tires appear to not be spinning, but rather are speed monitors, which track how fast the train is being propelled and depending on how fast the train is going, tells the other motors how fast to spin. If the train is going too fast, a fault will occur and the train will stop at the next possible stopping point. Each lift is 65 feet high; the first lift is a 20 degree incline, while the second lift is a 25 degree incline.

Trains
There are 2 trains, each with 15 cars. The cars have two types of wheels attached to them: Track wheels on top and guide wheels on the side. Every car has a brake fin underneath it to help in propelling the train through the drive tires and to assist in braking. Each car can seat two riders. There are three locking positions for the restraint system. The trains are themed to match the architectural style of the temple and surrounding area, with a man on the front that the employees, specifically the maintenance personnel, call Victor, in honor of a maintenance person who once worked at Knott's Berry Farm that had an uncanny resemblance to the man on the front of the train, but untimely died from a car accident.

Block System
Jaguar! has a semi-complex "block system" to prevent the trains from coming too close or in complete contact with each other. The location of each train is monitored by proximity sensors that when sensing the metal of the brake fin, send the location to the main computer, which is displayed on the main dispatch control panel. The ride has three different blocks not including the station. "A Block" is from the end of station approach into the station. "B Block" is from the top of Lift 1 to the top of Lift 2. "C Block", the only possible place to have a "Set Up" occur, is from the top of the second lift to the station approach section of the track. A "set up" is what occurs when one train attempts to enter a block already occupied by another train. The dispatch panel only allows the operator to send one train after the second train has cleared the second lift, thus entering the "C Block". There are six places where the train can stop: Station, Lift 1, Lift 2 Approach, Lift 2, "C" Brakes, Station Approach. The train enters the station from station approach automatically when "Auto Advance" is activated. However, if the "Auto Advance" is deactivated, the train will stay in Station Approach while the other train travels through A and B Block. Once the train hits the top of Lift 2 with the one train in Station Approach, both lifts will stop immediately and the dispatcher's display will read "067 Block C/Setup", indicating the two trains are attempting to occupy the same block. The other possible setup is an "061 Block R/Setup", when the trains become too close in the computer's readings, though only one train is occupying the blocks.

Changes
One of the first changes to the ride may have been the removal of the fire effect from the top of the temple and the steaming from the jaguars located in the Station Approach section of the track during Cedar Fair's corporate take over. Another change that occurred during the operation of Jaguar! was the addition of fabric seatbelts; very similar to the ones found on  MonteZOOMa: The Forbidden Fortress and GhostRider, also due to Cedar Fair. A second more noticeable change was the repainting of the attraction. It was changed from a red track with brown supports to a bright orange track with light blue supports. In 2016, the colors were returned to red track and light brown supports.

References

External links
Official Jaguar! page

Steel roller coasters
Roller coasters operated by Cedar Fair
Roller coasters in California
Roller coasters introduced in 1995